Moonrise and moonset are times when the upper limb of the Moon appears above the horizon and disappears below it, respectively. The exact times depend on the lunar phase and declination, as well as the observer's location. As viewed from outside the polar circles, the Moon, like all other celestial objects outside the circumpolar circle, rises from the eastern half of the horizon and sets into the western half due to Earth's rotation.

Direction and time

Direction 
Since Earth rotates eastward, all celestial objects outside the circumpolar circle (including the Sun, Moon, and stars) rise in the east and set in the west for observers outside the polar circles. Seasonal variation means that they sometimes rise in the east-northeast or east-southeast, and sometimes set in the west-southwest or west-northwest.

Time 

The Moon's position relative to Earth and the Sun determines the moonrise and moonset time. For example, a last quarter rises at midnight and sets at noon. A waning gibbous is best seen from late night to early morning. The Moon rises 30 to 70 minutes later each day/night than the day/night before, due to the fact that the Moon moves 13 degrees every day. Hence, the Earth must move 13 degrees after completing one rotation for the Moon to be visible.

Visual appearance 

The Moon appears to be larger at moonrise or moonset due to an illusion. This illusion, known as the Moon illusion, is caused by an effect of the brain. There is no definitive explanation for the Moon illusion. However, it's most likely because of how the brain perceives objects at different distances, and/or the distance we expect objects to be from us when they are near the horizon.

The Moon appears to be more yellowish near the horizon. This is for the same reason the Sun and/or sky appears to be orangey-red at sunrise/sunset. When the Moon appears near the horizon, the light coming from it has to pass through more layers of atmosphere. This scatters the blue away, and leaves yellow, orange, and red. This is also the reason the Moon appears red during a deep partial or total lunar eclipse.

Notes

References 

Moon
Recurring events